Stomopteryx neftensis is a moth of the family Gelechiidae. It is found in southern Tunisia.

References

Moths described in 1955
Stomopteryx